Thế Giới Publishers (literally "World Publishers") is Vietnam's official foreign language publishing house.

Company history
The publishing house was established in 1957 "to introduce readers around the world to Vietnam" through publications in English, French and other foreign languages. From 1957 to 1992 it was known as the Foreign Languages Publishing House and also as the Editions en Langues Etrangères. 

It also now publishes bilingual books and books in Vietnamese and publishes Vietnam Cultural Window an English language bi-monthly illustrated magazine, as well as a quarterly academic journal, Vietnamese Studies and its French version, Etudes Vietnamiennes. 

Thế Giới also offers consultancy services using its experience in translation and publishing for cooperative ventures in the book industry, printing and translation.

Subject specialities
Thế Giới publications cover a wide range of topics:
 General information about Vietnam: geography, history, ethnic groups, religion, etc.
 Politics and current events
 Socio-economic life
 Culture and tourism
 Literature and the arts
 Science and technology
 Warfare
 Notable people
 Dictionaries and reference books
 Teaching and learning Vietnamese

Book series

Under Foreign Languages Publishing House imprint
 Hibiscus Series

Under Editions en Langues Etrangères imprint
 Fleuve rouge (English, "Red River")
 Hibiscus Collection

Under The Gioi imprint
 Frequently Asked Questions About Vietnamese Culture
 The Many Faces of Vietnam
 Memoirs of War Series
 Tủ sách gương mặt Việt Nam (English, "Faces of Vietnam Bookshelf")
 Tu Sách Viêt Nam: Viên Viên Dông bác cô / Bibliothèque Vietnamienne: École francaise d'Extrême-Orient
 Vietnamese Tales and Legends Series
 Visages du Vietnam (English, "Faces of Vietnam")

See also
 Foreign Languages Publishing House (Soviet Union), Moscow - similar publisher in Soviet Union
Foreign Languages Press, Beijing – similar publisher in China
Foreign Languages Publishing House, Pyongyang – similar publisher in North Korea

References

Book publishing companies of Vietnam
Publishing companies established in 1957
Vietnamese companies established in 1957
Publishing companies of Vietnam